Gekhanist may refer to:
Geghanist (disambiguation), several places in Armenia
Geghadir, Shirak, Armenia